Plain is a small unincorporated community in Chelan County, Washington, United States.  It is located east of Coles Corner, Washington, near U.S. Route 2 and SR 207. Plain was serviced by the former SR 209, now called the Chumstick Highway, which connects Plain with Chumstick and Leavenworth along an old railroad grade.

A post office called Plain was established in 1913, and remained in operation until 1936.

Attractions and events
The town is the location of Plain Valley Ski Trails, a 25-km network of cross-country skiing and snowshoeing trails. A racing team, Plain Valley Nordic Team, is also based in the area.

Plain serves the start and finish for the Plain Endurance Runs, a pair of 100-mile/100-km ultramarathon races that began in 1997. The races are particularly challenging due to the fact that neither pacers, course markings nor aid stations are allowed per the race rules. This resulted in only four total finishers of the 100-mile race during the first eight years of its existence.

References

Populated places in Chelan County, Washington